The Justice Management Division (JMD) is a division of the United States Department of Justice. It is the administrative arm of the Department of Justice. Its mission is to support some 40 senior management offices (SMOs), offices, bureaus, and divisions (collectively called components) of the DOJ. It was formerly called the Office of Management and Finance.

Organizational chart
 Justice Management Division:Assistant Attorney General for Administration (AAG-A) (currently Lee J. Lofthus, appointed in December 2006; replaced Paul Corts, who left in the summer of 2006). The AAG-A reports to the Deputy Attorney General (DAG). 
 Deputy Assistant Attorney General/Chief Information Officer(DAAG/CIO) is Currently Melinda Rogers
 Service Delivery Staff
 Cybersecurity Services Staff
 Policy and Planning Staff
 Deputy Assistant Attorney General/Controller
 Budget Staff
 Finance Staff
 Strategic Planning and Performance Staff
 Debt Collection Management Staff
 Asset Forfeiture Management Staff
 Deputy Assistant Attorney General for Human Resources and Administration (DAAG/HRA)
 Human Resources Staff
 Equal Employment Opportunity Staff
 Security and Emergency Planning Staff
 Library Staff
 Consolidated Executive Office
 Departmental Executive Secretariat
 Deputy Assistant Attorney General for Policy, Management and Procurement
 Internal Review and Evaluation Office
 Office of General Counsel
 Facilities and Administrative Services Staff
 Departmental Ethics Office
 Procurement Services Staff
 Office of Records Management Policy
 Office of Acquisition Management

References

External links
 

Justice Management Division